Huidji See (born 30 May 1981 in Arnhem, Netherlands, also known as Huidji Lake) is a Dutch pool and billiards player. He was the 2011 WPA World 10-Ball Pool Champion.

Career

Early life
See was born in 1981 in the Netherlands, the son of Chinese parents, and grew up there. Instead of finishing his education, he opted for a career as a professional billiard player. In competitions he competes for the Rotterdam Billiards Club Thurston . His nickname in the pool billiard scene is Hooch.

Pool career
In 2007 See won silver in the WPA World Straight Pool Championship, losing the final 171–200 against the German Oliver Ortmann.

In the Straight pool world championship 2008 in New Brunswick See lost in the quarterfinals to Francisco Bustamante. At the European Pool Championship 2011 he was defeated in 10-ball in the quarterfinals the Russian Konstantin Stepanov, however, won the bronze medal in 9-ball.  In March 2010 in the European Pool Championship in the See won a bronze medal in straight pool.

In May 2011, See in Manila won the 2011 WPA World Ten-ball Championship with an 11–8 victory in the final against the Chinese title favorite Jian-Bo Fu. In the group stage he had previously successively defeated the players Jalal Yousef (9–3), Ricky Yang (9–7), Ko Pin-yi (9–6), Tony Drago (9–4) and Yukio Akakariyama (9–6).

See did not opt to retain his World 10-ball championship in 2015.

Titles
 2011 WPA World Ten-ball Championship
 2007 CSI U.S. Open 10-Ball Championship

References

External links
 Huidji See on azbilliards.com

WPA World Ten-ball Champions
Dutch pool players
Dutch people of Chinese descent
1981 births
Sportspeople from Arnhem
Living people